Riekkinen is a Finnish surname. Notable people with the surname include:

Joona Riekkinen (born 1999), Finnish ice hockey player
Joonas Riekkinen (born 1987), Finnish ice hockey player

Finnish-language surnames